The following is a list of public and private business schools in the country of Bangladesh.

Public 
 Army Institute of Business Administration - Army IBA
  Institute of Business Administration, University of Dhaka
 Institute of Business Administration, Jahangirnagar University
 Institute of Business Administration, University of Rajshahi
 Faculty of Business Studies, University of Dhaka
 Faculty of Business Studies, Jagannath University
Faculty of Business Studies, Islamic University, Bangladesh
Faculty of Business Studies, Begum Rokeya University
 Faculty of Business Administration, University of Chittagong
 School of Management and Business Administration, Khulna University
 Faculty of Business Studies, Bangladesh University of Professionals
 Faculty of Business Studies, Barisal University
 Faculty of Business Administration, Jatiya Kabi Kazi Nazrul Islam University

Private

North South University
Independent University, Bangladesh
East West University
Southeast University (Bangladesh)

References

 
Bangladesh
Business schools